Venkatachalam is one of the mandal in Nellore district of the Indian state of Andhra Pradesh.

Geography 
It has an average elevation of 20 meters (68 feet).

References 

Mandals in Nellore district